Everon Espacia (born 22 February 1984) is a Curaçaoan footballer who plays as a midfielder. He played at the 2014 FIFA World Cup qualifier.

See also
Football in Curaçao

References

1984 births
Living people
Association football midfielders
Curaçao footballers
Curaçao international footballers
Sekshon Pagá players
Place of birth missing (living people)